The Failures is a 2003 film directed by Tim Hunter. It stars Ashley Johnson and Chad Lindberg. It won three awards in 2003 and 2004.

Cast
Ashley Johnson as Lilly Kyle
Chad Lindberg as William
Seth Adkins as Sam Kyle
Claudia Christian as Anna
Michael Ironside as Depressor
Sasha Mitchell as Reflexor
Jesse Plemons as Boe

References

External links

2003 films
Films directed by Tim Hunter
2000s English-language films